John Patrick Coughlin (December 1, 1985 – January 18, 2019) was an American pair skater. With Caydee Denney, he was the 2012 Four Continents silver medalist and 2012 U.S. national champion. With previous partner Caitlin Yankowskas, he was the 2011 U.S. champion. Coughlin died by suicide, one day after the United States Center for SafeSport announced Coughlin would face an interim temporary suspension over unspecified allegations.

Early life and family 
Coughlin was born in Kansas City, Missouri. He was the son of a third-generation police officer. His mother, Stacy, died in February 2010 due to a chronic illness. He had a sister, Angela Laune.

Career

Early years 
Coughlin began skating at the age of six. Early in his career, Coughlin competed with Krista Smith, Kelsey Parker, and Lucy Galleher. He teamed up with Bridget Namiotka in late 2004. They were the 2006 junior national silver medalists. They announced the end of their partnership on July 3, 2007.

Partnership with Yankowskas 
Dalilah Sappenfield suggested Caitlin Yankowskas as a potential partner and they had a tryout in early August 2007. Yankowskas/Coughlin trained under Sappenfield in Colorado Springs, Colorado. They placed sixth at the 2008 U.S. Championships and made their Grand Prix debut at the 2008 Skate America.

During the 2010–11 season, their Ave Maria long program was a tribute to Coughlin's mother who died in February 2010. They finished fourth at 2010 NHK Trophy and won the first Grand Prix medal, bronze, at Cup of China. At the 2011 U.S. Nationals, they placed first in the short program and then won the free program to earn their first national title.

In April 2011, Yankowskas/Coughlin placed sixth in their debut at the World Championships. It was the best result by an American pair since 2006. On May 4, however, the pair announced that their partnership had ended.

Partnership with Denney

2011–2012 season 
On May 17, 2011, Coughlin announced that he had teamed up with Caydee Denney. They trained under coach Sappenfield at the Broadmoor Skating Club in Colorado Springs. Denney and Coughlin had a height differential of 14 inches (36 cm). They made their competitive debut at the Liberty Summer competition in July 2011, winning the short program. At the Nebelhorn Trophy they won the bronze medal. They were assigned to the 2011 Skate America and 2011 NHK Trophy, where they placed fourth and fifth respectively. 

Denney/Coughlin went on to win the 2012 US Championships and were assigned to Four Continents and Worlds. They won the silver medal at the 2012 Four Continents and placed eighth at 2012 Worlds.

2012–2013 season 
Denney/Coughlin made their season debut at the 2012 Nebelhorn Trophy, winning the silver medal. They won bronze medals at both of their Grand Prix assignments, the 2012 Skate America and the 2012 Rostelecom Cup. On December 4, 2012, Coughlin underwent surgery to repair a torn labrum in his left hip. As a result, the pair missed the 2013 U.S. Championships but they submitted a petition to be considered for the U.S. team to the 2013 World Championships. They were named in the U.S. team to the event but decided not to compete. Coughlin was off the ice for about nine weeks.

2013–2014 season 
Denney/Coughlin won silver at the 2013 U.S. Classic, placed fourth at the 2013 Skate America, and won bronze at the 2013 Trophée Eric Bompard. They took the bronze medal at the 2014 U.S. Championships, finishing behind champions Marissa Castelli / Simon Shnapir and silver medalists Felicia Zhang / Nathan Bartholomay, whose total score was greater by 0.29 of a point. Denney/Coughlin did not receive one of the two American spots in the pairs' event at the 2014 Winter Olympics but were assigned to the 2014 World Championships. They withdrew due to Denney's right ankle injury, sustained in practice on March 19. Denney was expected to return to training after eight to twelve weeks. In June 2014, the pair stated they would not compete in the 2014–15 season.

Sexual assault allegations, skating suspension, and death
Coughlin was found dead from suicide by hanging on January 18, 2019, one day after being suspended from figure skating for unspecified allegations. On December 17, 2018, the United States Center for SafeSport listed his name with the note "Interim Measure – Restriction", following allegations that Coughlin denied. He subsequently resigned as U.S. brand manager for John Wilson Blades.  On January 17, 2019, after SafeSport had changed Coughlin's status to "interim suspension", U.S. Figure Skating suspended him. The following afternoon, police were dispatched to his father's home in Kansas City following a report of a suicide. The department confirmed Coughlin's manner of death to be suicide. The incident report stated that he hanged himself.

In February 2019, SafeSport closed the investigation, saying that "[the Center] cannot advance an investigation when no potential threat exists."

In May 2019, in a Facebook post, former skating partner Bridget Namiotka accused Coughlin of sexually abusing her over a period of two years during the mid-2000s. She had skated with him while she was between the ages of 14 and 17.  He was four years older than she was. Namiotka died July 25, 2022. Her parents released a statement that said in part that "Bridget succumbed to her long struggles with addiction after several very difficult years of dealing with the trauma of sexual abuse."

In July 2019, former US ladies' champion and World silver medalist Ashley Wagner reported that Coughlin had sexually assaulted her in 2008 at a US national team training camp.

In December 2019, former US skater Melissa Bulanhagui accused Coughlin of grooming her and other underage skaters at the rink where they both trained. Bulanhagui was between the ages of 14 and 18 at the time and Coughlin was five years her senior.

Programs

With Denney

With Yankowskas

With Namiotka

Competitive highlights

With Denney

With Yankowskas

With Namiotka

With Galleher

Men's singles

References

External links 

1985 births
2019 deaths
Sportspeople from Kansas City, Missouri
American male pair skaters
Four Continents Figure Skating Championships medalists
Suicides by hanging in Missouri
2019 suicides